The 2017 Men's US Junior Squash Championships is the men's edition of the 2017 US Junior Open squash championship, which is a World Junior Squash Circuit Tier 2 event. The event primarily took place at the Payne Whitney Gymnasium at Yale University in New Haven, Connecticut from December 16 to 19. Mexico's Leonel Cárdenas won his third US Junior Open title, defeating Adhitya Raghavan of India in the Boys' Under 19 final. India's Yash Fadte won his first US Junior Open title, defeating Ayush Menon of the United States in the Boys' Under 17 final.

Seeds (Boys' Under 19)

Draw and results

Finals

Top half

Section 1

Section 2

Bottom half

Section 1

Section 2

Seeds (Boys' Under 17)

Draw and results

Finals

Top half

Section 1

Section 2

Bottom half

Section 1

Section 2

See also
British Junior Open Squash 2017
Dutch Junior Open Squash 2017
World Junior Squash Championships
Men's US Open 2017

References

External links
 

US Junior Open
Squash in Connecticut